Tersilochus is a genus of the parasitic wasp family Ichneumonidae. The type species is Tersilochus jocator.

Species
 Subgenus Gonolochus Förster, 1869
 Tersilochus caudatus Holmgren, 1860
 Tersilochus fenestralis Thomson, 1889
 Tersilochus nitens Horstmann & Kolarov, 1988
 Tersilochus rugulosus Horstmann, 1981
 Tersilochus stenocari Gregor, 1941
 Tersilochus thuringiacus Schmiedeknecht, 1911
 Subgenus Pectinolochus Aubert, 1960
 Tersilochus acutangulus Khalaim, 2007
 Tersilochus apicator Khalaim, 2007
 Tersilochus asper Horstmann, 1981
 Tersilochus bulyuki Khalaim, 2007
 Tersilochus coeliodicola Silvestri, 1917
 Tersilochus ensifer Brischke, 1880
 Tersilochus griseolus Khalaim, 2007
 Tersilochus hungaricus Horstmann, 1981
 Tersilochus intermedius Horstmann, 1981
 Tersilochus junius Khalaim, 2007
 Tersilochus kerzhneri Khalaim, 2007
 Tersilochus lapponicus Hellén, 1958
 Tersilochus luteicornis Hellén, 1958
 Tersilochus rossicus Horstmann, 1981
 Tersilochus rubrigaster Khalaim, 2007
 Tersilochus spiracularis Horstmann, 1971
 Tersilochus striola Thomson, 1889
 Tersilochus terebrator Horstmann, 1971
 Tersilochus ungularis Horstmann, 1981
 Subgenus Tersilochus Holmgren, 1859
 Tersilochus abyssinicus Khalaim, 2006
 Tersilochus brevissimus Horstmann, 1981
 Tersilochus conotracheli Riley, 1871
 Tersilochus curvator Horstmann, 1981
 Tersilochus deficiens Provancher, 1888
 Tersilochus dentatus Horstmann & Kolarov, 1988
 Tersilochus filicornis Thomson, 1889
 Tersilochus fulvipes Gravenhorst, 1829
 Tersilochus heterocerus Thomson, 1889
 Tersilochus jocator Holmgren, 1859
 Tersilochus liopleuris Thomson, 1889
 Tersilochus longicaudatus Horstmann, 1971
 Tersilochus longicornis Thomson, 1889
 Tersilochus meridionalis Morley, 1913
 Tersilochus microgaster Szépligeti, 1899
 Tersilochus ningxiator Khalaim & Sheng, 2009
 Tersilochus nitidipleuris Horstmann, 1971
 Tersilochus obliquus Thomson, 1889
 Tersilochus obscurator Aubert, 1959
 Tersilochus orientalis Uchida, 1942
 Tersilochus petiolaris Horstmann, 1981
 Tersilochus ruberi Horstmann, 1981
 Tersilochus rufovarius Horstmann, 1981
 Tersilochus runatus Khalaim & Sheng, 2009
 Tersilochus rusticulus Khalaim, 2006
 Tersilochus similis Szépligeti, 1899
 Tersilochus subdepressus Thomson, 1889
 Tersilochus thyridialis Horstmann, 1971
 Tersilochus triangularis Gravenhorst, 1807
 Tersilochus tripartitus Brischke, 1880
 Tersilochus varius Horstmann, 1981
 Species incertae sedis:
 Tersilochus consimilis Holmgren, 1860	
 Tersilochus dilatatus Brischke, 1880
 Tersilochus longulus Brischke, 1880
 Tersilochus quercetorum Strobl, 1901
 Tersilochus sericeus Brischke, 1880
 Tersilochus sulcatus Hellén, 1958

Gallery

External links
Species List
Review of Tersilochinae (Hymenoptera, Ichneumonidae) of China, with descriptions of four new species Zookeys Pensoft

Ichneumonidae genera
Taxa named by August Holmgren